The Wronged Man is a 2010 American television film directed by Tom McLoughlin and starring Julia Ormond and Mahershala Ali.  Gale Anne Hurd served as an executive producer of the film.

Cast
Julia Ormond as Janet Gregory
Mahershala Ali as Calvin Willis
Lisa Arrindell Anderson as Michelle Willis
Bruce McKinnon	as Randy Arthur
Omar J. Dorsey as Leroy Matthews
Rhoda Griffis as Tina
Tonea Stewart as Ms. Newton
Lucius Baston as Shelton
Russ Comegys as Wayne

References

External links
 
 

Films directed by Tom McLoughlin
2010 television films
2010 films
Lifetime (TV network) films
Films produced by Gale Anne Hurd
2010s English-language films